Clayfield is an electoral division of the Legislative Assembly of Queensland. It is centred on the inner northern suburb of Clayfield in the state capital of Brisbane.

The seat was first created in 1950, and consistently returned members for the Liberal Party until its abolition in 1977. The bulk of the seat was merged into nearby Merthyr.

It was recreated in 1992 as part of the electoral reforms that ended Bjelke-Petersen-era malapportionment, and was easily won by Liberal candidate Santo Santoro, the last member for Merthyr and later a Borbidge government minister. Santoro was re-elected in 1996 and 1998, but was defeated in a shock result in 2001 by actress and Labor candidate Liddy Clark. Clark held on to the normally safe Liberal seat for two terms, but after a controversy-scarred term as a minister, was defeated by Liberal candidate Tim Nicholls in 2006.

A redistribution in 2008 made Clayfield notionally Labor by 0.2%, but the Liberal National Party achieved a swing strong enough for Nicholls to retain his seat in the 2009 election.

Nicholls was the last deputy leader of the state Liberal Party from 2007 to 2009, served as state Treasurer in the Newman government, and was leader of the LNP from 2016 to 2017.

Members for Clayfield

Election results

References

External links
 Electorate profile (Antony Green, ABC)

Clayfield